Kenneth Jezek is an American actor and dancer.

Career
Kenneth Jezek is best known for playing Lars Englund on the TV soap opera Days of Our Lives, in 1986 and 1987.

Prior to transitioning into acting, he was a professional dancer, often touring and teaching master jazz and tap classes in the United States, Europe, and Canada. Jezek's dancing credits include the Los Angeles companies of the award-winning Broadway musicals Cats and 42nd Street. He was also a regular series dancer in Fame, and a featured dancer in the movies Pretty In Pink and Fast Forward.

Jezek has numerous national and local commercial, music video and industrial credits as well.

Often credited as "Kenny" (due to the fact his middle initial is "E"), Jezek's movie career resurrected in 2009 with the Advent Film Group production Come What May with his wife Karen.

Personal life
Kenneth Jezek is married to actress Karen Kelly who played Brenda Clegg on Capitol.

After leaving Hollywood, the couple (who met at a Hollywood party in 1986), were married in 1989 and became heavily involved in the theatrical arts ministry of a large local church where they acted, directed, and choreographed skits and musical productions. They have also starred in three independent Christian films, including Karla Faye Tucker: Forevermore in which Karen played the title role. In addition to Come What May, the Jezeks can be seen together in A Father's Heart.

They moved to Arizona in 1988 and have two daughters, Savanna  and Shiloh. In 1999, the pair appeared on The 700 Club to talk about their new life as born again Christians.

Jezek holds black belts and full instructor certifications in several martial arts disciplines, founded Christian Freestyle Karate, and owned and operated a successful martial arts school.

They reside in Chandler, Arizona.

Filmography

References

External links
 
 
 Kenny Jezek Commentary and Photo on Come What May Website

American male film actors
Place of birth missing (living people)
Year of birth missing (living people)
Living people
American male dancers